Habroteleia persimilis, is a species of wasp belonging to the family Platygastridae.

Distribution
It is found in countries such as Japan, China, South Korea and Vietnam.

Description
Female is larger than male. Body length of female is about 4.75–5.18 mm, whereas male is 4.25–4.74 mm. Mesosoma and metasoma are black. Antennae scrobe is punctate rugose to smooth. Central keel present.

References

Scelioninae
Insects described in 1985